Mark Lisle (born 12 August 1962) is  a former Australian rules footballer who played with North Melbourne in the Victorian Football League (VFL).  Following his VFL career, he played five seasons with Box Hill in the Victorian Football Association, captaining the club from 1991 until 1993 and being named on the interchange bench in the club's Team of the Century.

Notes

External links 		
		
		
		
		
		
		
Living people		
1962 births		
		
Australian rules footballers from Victoria (Australia)		
North Melbourne Football Club players
Box Hill Football Club players